The Franklin-Simpson Stakes is a Grade III American Thoroughbred horse race for three years olds, over a distance of  furlongs on the turf held annually in September at Kentucky Downs racetrack in Franklin, Kentucky during their short turf meeting.  The event currently carries an offered purse of $600,000.

History 
The event was inaugurated on 14 September 2017 over the seven furlong distance and was won by the Wesley A. Ward trained Master Merion by 2 lengths in a time of 1:27.95.

The event was named  honor the city, Franklin, and the county Simpson where the Kentucky Downs racetrack is located.

The name of this event was used previously in 2008 for a race which was open for three-year-olds and older over the one mile distance. However, that event was later renamed and the name was idle since 2014.

In 2018 the distance of the event was decreased to  furlongs.

In 2019 the event was upgraded to a Grade III. With the influx of gaming revenue at Kentucky Downs the purse for the event has risen dramatically to nearly $500,000 offered by 2019.

Records
Speed record: 
  furlongs: 1:14.59 One Timer (2022)

Margins: 
  lengths: One Timer (2022)

Most wins by an owner:
 3 - Qatar Racing (2019, 2020, 2021)

Most wins by a jockey:
 2 - Tyler Gaffalione (2020, 2021)

Most wins by a trainer:
 2 - Brendan Walsh (2020, 2021)

Winners

See also
List of American and Canadian Graded races

References 

Kentucky Downs
Graded stakes races in the United States
Grade 3 stakes races in the United States
Recurring sporting events established in 2017
2017 establishments in Kentucky
Horse races in Kentucky
Turf races in the United States